Győri ETO FC is a professional football club based in Győr, Hungary.

Managers
  Károly Fogl II (1938–39)
  József Lóránt (1945–46)
  Béla Farkas (1945–46)
  Lajos Remmer (1946–47)
  Pál Horváth (1947–48)
  Lajos Baróti (1948–52)
  Ferenc Magyar (1952)
  Imre Pál Kovács (1952–54)
  Rudolf Jeny (1955)
  Imre Pál Kovács (1958–59)
  István Orczifalvi (1960–62)
  Ferenc Szusza (1962–63)
  Nándor Hidegkuti (1963–65)
  Ferenc Szusza (1966–68)
  József Mészáros (1969–71)
  Ágoston Dombos (1970–71)
  László Győrfi (1971–72)
  Ferenc Farsang (1972–75)
  Antal Pálfy (1975–76)
  Tibor Palicskó (1976–78)
  Imre Kovács (1978–81)
  József Verebes (1981–86)
  Imre Gellei (1986–87)
  László Győrfi (1986–88)
  Sándor Haász (1988–89)
  Károly Pecze (1989–90)
  Róbert Glázer (1990–92)
  Lázár Szentes (1992)
  Barnabás Tornyi (1992–93)
  József Verebes (1993–95)
  László Győrfi (1994–96)
  József Póczik (1995–96)
  Sándor Haász (1995–97)
  László Keglovich (1997)
  István Reszeli Soós (1997–99)
  Károly Gergely (1999–00)
  József Garami (July 1, 1999 – June 30, 2001)
  Zoltán Varga (2001)
  Zsolt Tamási (2001–03)
  Aurél Csertői (January 1, 2003 – June 30, 2003)
  József Kiprich (November 11, 2003 – December 4, 2003)
  István Reszeli Soós (December 4, 2003 – November 22, 2005)
  János Csank (November 22, 2005 – July 10, 2006)
  János Pajkos (July 11, 2006 – December 5, 2006)
  István Reszeli Soós (interim) (December 5, 2006 – December 11, 2006)
  István Klement (December 21, 2006 – June 15, 2007)
  Sándor Egervári (June 1, 2007 – January 1, 2009)
  Dragoljub Bekvalac (January 1, 2009 – June 30, 2009)
  Attila Pintér (July 1, 2009 – March 6, 2011)
  Aurél Csertői (March 7, 2011 – March 5, 2012)
  Attila Pintér (March 6, 2012 – December 19, 2013)
  Ferenc Horváth (30 December 2013 – 24 November 2014)
  Vasile Miriuță (24 November 2014 – 9 July 2015)
  Zoltán Németh (9 July 2015 – 2016)
  Tamás Preszeller (2015 – 2016)
  Balázs Bekő (2016 – 2017)
  Lázár Szentes (2017 – 22 June 2018)
  Géza Mészöly (22 June 2018–11 September 2018)
   József Király (11 September 2018–19 March 2019)
  Miklós Herczeg (19 March 2019-present)
 Elemér Kondás (3 December 2019)
 Péter Tuifel (24 August 2020)
 Sándor Csató (2 September-present)

References

External links

Győri ETO FC